DC++ is a free and open-source, peer-to-peer file-sharing client that can be used for connecting to the Direct Connect network or to the ADC protocol. It is developed primarily by Jacek Sieka, nicknamed arnetheduck.

History and background 
DC++ is a free and open-source alternative to the original client, NeoModus Direct Connect (NMDC); it connects to the same file-sharing network and supports the same file-sharing protocol. One of the reasons commonly attributed to the popularity of DC++ is that it has no adware of any kind, unlike NMDC.

Many other clients exist for the Direct Connect network, and most of these are DC++ "mods": modified versions of DC++, based on DC++'s source code. A partial list of DC++ mods is given below. Some of these clients were developed for specialized communities (e.g. music-sharing communities), or in order to support specific experimental features, or perhaps features that have been rejected from inclusion in DC++ itself. An example of an experimental feature is hashing, which was initially implemented in BCDC++ and later adopted by DC++.

, DC++ had around 90% market share of the Direct Connect community.

Forks 

An advantage of the free and open-source nature of DC++ is that several mods have been released which add features to the original client.

Many users send patches to DC++ which are included in future releases, but some features are rejected by the developer. Stated reasons for rejecting a patch are because they are coded poorly, or that the feature is frivolous, abusable or overly specialized, and does not belong in the main client. Examples include: upload bandwidth limiting (many users feel that upload bandwidth limiting is a form of cheating, while other users not using a full-duplex network connection can only achieve reasonable download speeds by limiting uploads), colorized chat, specialized operator functions (e.g. client/share checking).

The developers of some forks contribute features and bug fixes back upstream to DC++.

Client software comparison

General

Operating system support

Interface and programming

Features

See also 

 Direct Connect (protocol)
 Advanced Direct Connect

References

External links 

 DC++ (Official website)
 DC++ Webhelp

Direct Connect network
Free file sharing software
Free software programmed in C++
Windows-only free software
1999 software